The American Society of Mammalogists (ASM) was founded in 1919. Its primary purpose is to encourage the study of mammals, and professions studying them. There are over 4,500 members of this society, and they are primarily professional scientists who emphasize the importance of public policy and education.  There are several ASM meetings held each year and the society manages several publications such as the Journal of Mammalogy, Special Publications, Mammalian Species, and Society Pamphlets.  The best known of these is the Journal of Mammalogy. The ASM also maintains The Mammal Image Library which contains more than 1300 mammal slides.  A president, vice president, recording secretary, secretary-treasurer, and journal editor are all elected by the members to be officers of the society. In addition, ASM is composed of thirty one committees, including the Animal Care and Use Committee, the Conservation Awards Committee, the International Relations Committee, and the Publications Committee. It also provides numerous grants and awards for research and studies on mammals. These awards can go to both scientists and students. The ASM also lists employment opportunities for their members.

External links
American Society of Mammalogists Website
Journal of Mammalogy website
Mammalian Species website

Professional associations based in the United States
Natural Science Collections Alliance members
Mammalogy
Biology societies
1919 establishments in the United States